Bolton and Undercliffe is a ward in the metropolitan borough of the City of Bradford, West Yorkshire, England.  It contains 20 listed buildings that are recorded in the National Heritage List for England.  All the listed buildings are designated at Grade II, the lowest of the three grades, which is applied to "buildings of national importance and special interest".  The ward is a suburb of Bradford to the northeast of the city centre and is almost completely residential.  It includes Peel Park which contains listed buildings, including the entrance lodges, statues, drinking fountains, and a relocated doorway and wall.  The other listed buildings include houses and cottages, farmhouses and farm buildings, a church, and a school.


Buildings

References

Citations

Sources

 

Lists of listed buildings in West Yorkshire
Listed